The Tarantula is a 1916 American silent drama film written and directed by George D. Baker and starring Edith Storey and Antonio Moreno.

Cast
 Edith Storey as Chonita Alvarado
 Antonio Moreno as Pedro Mendoza
 Charles Kent as Van Allen
 Eulalie Jensen as Donna Luz
 L. Rogers Lytton as Senor Alvarado
 Harry Hollingsworth as Teddy Steele
 Emanuel A. Turner as Beauty Smythe
 Raymond Walburn as Saunders

References

External links

American silent feature films
1916 drama films
American black-and-white films
Silent American drama films
1916 films
Vitagraph Studios films
Films directed by George D. Baker
1910s American films